Franky G (born Frank Gonzales; October 30, 1965) is an American film and television actor. He is perhaps best known for his portrayal of Xavier in Saw II and Wrench in the 2003 remake of The Italian Job as well as other various roles such as Lupus in Confidence and Detective Cruz in Wonderland.

Early life and career
Gonzalez's parents moved from Puerto Rico to Williamsburg, Brooklyn, New York City. Gonzalez was born in Williamsburg and later moved to Flushing, Queens. Before acting, he played semi-professional football, worked as a bouncer and security guard in New York clubs. He studied criminal law in college. Gonzalez replied to an ad for Manito (then called Cruel World) in Backstage magazine; three weeks later he was called to read the script for director Eric Eason.  The film played in 50 festivals in 2002.  The following year he was cast at the last minute for the role of Wrench in The Italian Job. In 2005, he played Jonny Calvo in the short-lived Fox Network television show Jonny Zero and played Xavier in the horror film Saw II.

In February 2023, he was cast in a television series, Demonico.

Filmography

References

External links

1965 births
American male film actors
American male television actors
American people of Puerto Rican descent
Hispanic and Latino American male actors
Living people
People from Williamsburg, Brooklyn
People from Flushing, Queens
Male actors from New York City